Tachina vernalis is a species of fly in the genus Tachina of the family Tachinidae that is endemic to US state of New Mexico.

References

Insects described in 1897
Diptera of North America
Endemic fauna of the United States
victoria